Ramiro Sanchiz (born November 6, 1978) is a Uruguayan writer, literary critic and translator. He is known for the creation of "Projecto Stahl", a literary project which hopes to explore the different permutations of a universe that revolves around Federico Stahl, a character that appears in all of Sanchiz's works.

Biography 
Ramiro Sanchiz was born on November 6, 1978 in Montevideo. His first science fiction stories were published in science fiction and fantasy magazines and fanzines like the Uruguayan Diaspar and the Argentinian Galileo and Axxón, The first of his stories to be included in a book was "Yocasta" in El descontento y la promesa (Editorial Trilce) in 2008. The following year, Estuario Editora published Perséfone, his first novel, accompanied by a comic illustrated  by Matías Bergara. Since then Sanchiz has published more than twenty books.

All of Sanchiz's narrative revolves around the character of Federico Stahl, in whom some, including the Uruguayan literary critic Alicia Torres, believe to have seen an alter ego of the author. A good part of these novels can be included in genres such as science fiction or "new weird".

Works

Novels 
Perséfone (Estuario Editora, 2009)
Vampiros porteños, sombras solitarias (Meninas Cartoneras, 2010)
Nadie recuerda a Mlejnas (Editorial Reina Negra, 2011)
La vista desde el puente (Estuario Editora, 2011)
Los viajes (Editorial Melón, 2012)
Trashpunk (Ediciones del CEC, 2012; Mig21 Editora, 2021)
Ficción para un imperio (Editorial Milena Caserola, 2014)
El orden del mundo (Editorial El Cuervo, 2014; Editorial Fin de Siglo, 2017)
El gato y la entropía #12 & 35 (Estuario Editora, 2015)
Dos crímenes por página (Suburbano Ediciones, 2016)
Verde (Editorial Fin de Siglo, 2016)
Las imitaciones (Décima Editora, 2016; Ediciones Vestigio, 2019)
La expansión del universo (Literatura Random House, 2018)
Guitarra negra (Estuario Editora, 2019)
Un pianista de provincias (Random House, 2022)
Ahab (Editorial Pan, 2022)

Stories 
"Del otro lado" (La Propia Cartonera, 2010)
"Algunos de los otros" (Editorial Trilce, 2010)
"Algunos de los otros redux" (Editorial Reina Negra, 2012)
"Los otros libros" (La Propia Cartonera, 2012)

Essays 
Caída libre (Estuario Editora, 2017)
David Bowie: posthumanismo sónico (Editorial Holobionte, 2020)
Matrix Acelerada (Editorial Holobionte, 2022)
Ejercicios de dactilografía (Pez en el Hielo, 2022)

Translations 
Fanged Noumena vol.1, Nick Land (Editorial Holobionte, 2019)
Hackear a Coyote, Alan Mills (Ediciones Vestigio, 2021)
Teleoplexia, Nick Land (Editorial Holobionte, 2021)
Texto entraña, Mike Corrao (Ediciones Vestigio, 2022. Con Diego Cepeda y Rodrigo Bastidas)
Peckinpah, D. Harlan Wilson (Ediciones Vestigio, 22. Con Diego Cepeda)

Recognition 
Mention of La vista desde el puente in the National Literature Prize (Uruguay), 2013
First National Literature Prize (Uruguay) for El orden del mundo, 2016
Mention of Verde in the National Literature Prize (Uruguay), 2018
Mention of La expansión del universo in the National Literature Prize (Uruguay), 2020

References

External links 
Ramiro Sanchiz on Goodreads

1978 births
Uruguayan novelists
Writers from Montevideo
Uruguayan science fiction writers
Living people